Viking activity in the British Isles occurred during the Early Middle Ages, the 8th to the 11th centuries AD, when Scandinavians travelled to the British Isles to raid, conquer, settle and trade. They are generally referred to as Vikings, but some scholars debate whether the term Viking represented all Scandinavian settlers or just those who used violence.

At the start of the Early Medieval period, Scandinavian kingdoms had developed trade links reaching as far as southern Europe and the Mediterranean, giving them access to foreign imports, such as silver, gold, bronze, and spices. These trade links also extended westwards into Ireland and Britain.

In the last decade of the eighth century, Viking raiders sacked several Christian monasteries in northern Britain, and over the next three centuries they launched increasingly large scale invasions and settled in many areas, especially in eastern Britain and Ireland, the islands north and west of Scotland and the Isle of Man.

Background

During the Early Medieval period, the islands of Ireland and Britain were each culturally, linguistically, and religiously divided among various peoples. The languages of the Celtic Britons and of the Gaels descended from the Celtic languages spoken by Iron Age inhabitants of Europe. In Ireland and parts of western Scotland, as well as in the Isle of Man, people spoke an early form of Celtic Gaelic known as Old Irish. In Cornwall, Cumbria, Wales, and south-west Scotland, the Celtic Brythonic languages were spoken (their modern descendants include Welsh and Cornish). The Picts, who spoke the Pictish language, lived in the area north of the Forth and Clyde rivers, which now constitutes a large portion of modern-day Scotland. Due to the scarcity of writing in Pictish, which survives only in Ogham, views differ as to whether Pictish was a Celtic language like those spoken further south, or perhaps even a non-Indo-European language like Basque. However, most inscriptions and place-names hint towards the Picts being Celtic in language and culture. Most peoples of Britain and Ireland had already predominantly converted to Christianity from their older, pre-Christian polytheistic religions. In contrast to the rest of the isles though, much of southern Britain had become the various kingdoms of Anglo-Saxon England, where Anglo-Saxon migrants from continental Europe had settled during the fifth century CE, bringing with them their own Germanic language (known as Old English), a polytheistic religion (Anglo-Saxon paganism) and their own distinct cultural practices. By the time of the Viking incursions though, Anglo-Saxon England too had become mostly Christian.

In northern Britain, in the area roughly corresponding to modern-day Scotland, lived three distinct ethnic groups in their own respective kingdoms: the Picts, Scots, and Britons. The Pictish cultural group dominated the majority of Scotland, with major populations concentrated between the Firth of Forth and the River Dee, as well as in Sutherland, Caithness, and Orkney. The Scots, according to written sources, constituted a tribal group which had crossed to Britain from Dalriada in the north of Ireland during the late-fifth century. Archaeologists have not been able to identify anything that was unique to the kingdom of the Scots, noting similarities with the Picts in most forms of material culture. The northern Britons lived in the Old North, in parts of what have become southern Scotland and northern England, and, by the seventh or eighth centuries, these had apparently come under the political control of Anglo-Saxons.

By the mid-ninth century, Anglo-Saxon England comprised four separate and independent kingdoms: East Anglia, Wessex, Northumbria, and Mercia, the last of which was the strongest military power. Between half a million and a million people lived in England at this time, with society being rigidly hierarchical. The class system had a king and his ealdormen at the top, under whom ranked the thegns (or landholders), and then the various categories of agricultural workers below them. Beneath all of these was a class of slaves, who may have made up as much as a quarter of the population. The majority of the populace lived in the countryside, although a few large towns had developed, notably London and York, which became centres of royal and ecclesiastical administration. There were also a number of trading ports, such as Hamwic and Ipswich, which engaged in foreign trade.

Viking raids: 780s–850

In the final decade of the eighth century, Viking raiders attacked a series of Christian monasteries in the British Isles. Here, these monasteries had often been positioned on small islands and in other remote coastal areas so that the monks could live in seclusion, devoting themselves to worship without the interference of other elements of society. At the same time, it made them isolated and unprotected targets for attack.

The first known account of a Viking raid in Anglo-Saxon England comes from 789, when three ships from Hordaland (in modern Norway) landed in the Isle of Portland on the southern coast of Wessex. They were approached by Beaduheard, the royal reeve from Dorchester, whose job it was to identify all foreign merchants entering the kingdom, and they proceeded to kill him. There were almost certainly unrecorded earlier raids. In a document dating to 792, King Offa of Mercia set out privileges granted to monasteries and churches in Kent, but he excluded military service "against seaborne pirates with migrating fleets", showing that Viking raids were already an established problem. In a letter of 790–92 to King Æthelred I of Northumbria, Alcuin berated English people for copying the fashions of pagans who menaced them with terror. This shows that there were already close contacts between the two peoples, and the Vikings would have been well informed about their targets.

The next recorded attack against the Anglo-Saxons came the following year, in 793, when the monastery at Lindisfarne, an island off England's eastern coast, was sacked by a Viking raiding party on 8 June. The following year, they sacked the nearby Monkwearmouth–Jarrow Abbey. In 795, they once again attacked, this time raiding Iona Abbey off Scotland's west coast. This monastery was attacked again in 802 and 806, when 68 people living there were killed. After this devastation, the monastic community at Iona abandoned the site and fled to Kells in Ireland. In the first decade of the ninth century, Viking raiders began to attack coastal districts of Ireland. In 835, the first major Viking raid in southern England took place and was directed against the Isle of Sheppey.

England runestones

The England runestones is a group of about 30 runestones in Sweden which refer to Viking Age voyages to England. They constitute one of the largest groups of runestones that mention voyages to other countries, and they are comparable in number only to the approximately 30 Greece Runestones and the 26 Ingvar Runestones, of which the latter refer to a Viking expedition to the Middle East. They were engraved in Old Norse with the Younger Futhark.

The Anglo-Saxon rulers paid large sums, Danegelds, to Vikings, who mostly came from Denmark and Sweden who arrived to the English shores during the 990s and the first decades of the 11th century. Some runestones relate of these Danegelds, such as the Yttergärde runestone, U 344, which tells of Ulf of Borresta who received the danegeld three times, and the last one he received from Canute the Great. Canute sent home most of the Vikings who had helped him conquer England, but he kept a strong bodyguard, the Þingalið, and its members are also mentioned on several runestones.

The vast majority of the runestones, 27, were raised in modern-day Sweden and 17 in the oldest Swedish provinces around lake Mälaren. In contrast, modern-day Denmark has no such runestones, but there is a runestone in Scania which mentions London. There is also a runestone in Norway and a Swedish one in Schleswig, Germany.

Some Vikings, such as Guðvér, did not only attack England, but also Saxony, as reported by the Grinda Runestone Sö 166 in Södermanland:

Treasure hoards
Various hoards of treasure were buried in England at this time. Some of these may have been deposited by Anglo-Saxons attempting to hide their wealth from Viking raiders, and others by the Viking raiders as a way of protecting their looted treasure.

One of these hoards, discovered in Croydon (historically part of Surrey, now in Greater London) in 1862, contained 250 coins, three silver ingots, and part of a fourth as well as four pieces of hack silver in a linen bag. Archaeologists interpret this as loot collected by a member of the Viking army. By dating the artefacts, archaeologists estimated that this hoard had been buried in 872, when the army wintered in London. The coins themselves came from a wide range of different kingdoms, with Wessex, Mercian, and East Anglian examples found alongside foreign imports from Carolingian-dynasty Francia and from the Arab world. Not all such Viking hoards in England contain coins, however: for example, at Bowes Moor, Durham, 19 silver ingots were discovered, whilst at Orton Scar, Cumbria, a silver neck-ring and penannular brooch were uncovered.

The historian Peter Hunter Blair believed that the success of the Viking raids and the "complete unpreparedness of Britain to meet such attacks" became major factors in the subsequent Viking invasions and colonisation of large parts of the British Isles.

Invasion and Danelaw: 865–896
From 865, the Viking attitude towards the British Isles changed, as they began to see it as a place for potential colonisation rather than simply a place to raid. As a result of this, larger armies began arriving on Britain's shores, with the intention of conquering land and constructing settlements there. The early Viking settlers would have appeared visibly different from the Anglo-Saxon populace, wearing Scandinavian styles of jewellery, and probably also wearing their own peculiar styles of clothing. Viking and Anglo-Saxon men also had different hairstyles: Viking men's hair was shaved at the back and left shaggy on the front, whilst the Anglo-Saxons typically wore their hair long.

England

Viking armies captured York, the major city in the Kingdom of Northumbria, in 866. Counterattacks concluded in a decisive defeat for Anglo-Saxon forces at York on 21 March 867, and the deaths of Northumbrian leaders Ælla and Osberht.

Other Anglo-Saxon kings began to capitulate to the Viking demands and surrendered land to Viking settlers. In addition, many areas in eastern and northern England—including all but the northernmost parts of Northumbria—came under the direct rule of Viking leaders or their puppet kings.

King Æthelred of Wessex, who had been leading the conflict against the Vikings, died in 871 and was succeeded on the throne of Wessex by his younger brother, Alfred. The Viking king of Northumbria, Halfdan Ragnarrson (Old English: Healfdene)—one of the leaders of the Viking Great Army (known to the Anglo-Saxons as the Great Heathen Army)—surrendered his lands to a second wave of Viking invaders in 876. In the next four years, Vikings gained further land in the kingdoms of Mercia and East Anglia as well. King Alfred continued his conflict with the invading forces but was driven back into Somerset in the south-west of his kingdom in 878, where he was forced to take refuge in the marshes of Athelney.

Alfred regrouped his military forces and defeated the armies of the Viking monarch of East Anglia, Guthrum, at the Battle of Edington (May 878). Sometime after the Battle of Edington, a treaty was agreed that set out the lasting peace terms between the two kings that included the boundaries of each of their kingdoms. It is known as the Treaty of Alfred and Guthrum. The treaty is one of the few existing documents of Alfred's reign and survives in Old English in Corpus Christi College, Cambridge, Manuscript 383, and in a Latin compilation, known as Quadripartitus. The areas to the north and east became known as the Danelaw because it was under Viking political influence, whilst those areas to the south and west remained under Anglo-Saxon dominance. Alfred's government set about constructing a series of defended towns or burhs, began the construction of a navy, and organised a militia system (the fyrd), whereby half of his peasant army remained on active service at any one time. To maintain the burhs, and the standing army, he set up a taxation and conscription system known as the Burghal Hidage.

In 892 a new Viking army, with 250 ships, established itself in Appledore, Kent and another army of 80 ships soon afterwards in Milton Regis. The army then launched a continuous series of attacks on Wessex. However, due in part to the efforts of Alfred and his army, the kingdom's new defences proved to be a success, and the Viking invaders were met with a determined resistance and made less of an impact than they had hoped. By 896, the invaders dispersed—instead settling in East Anglia and Northumbria, with some instead sailing to Normandy.

Alfred's policy of opposing the Viking settlers continued under his daughter Æthelflæd, who married Æthelred, Ealdorman of Mercia, and also under her brother, King Edward the Elder (reigned 899–924). When Edward died in July 924, his son Æthelstan became king. In 927, he conquered the last remaining Viking kingdom, York, making him the first Anglo-Saxon ruler of the whole of England. In 934, he invaded Scotland and forced Constantine II to submit to him, but Æthelstan's rule was resented by the Scots and Vikings, and, in 937, they invaded England. Æthelstan defeated them at the Battle of Brunanburh, a victory which gave him great prestige both in the British Isles and on the Continent and led to the collapse of Viking power in northern Britain. After his death in 939, the Vikings seized back control of York, and it was not finally reconquered until 954.

Edward's son Edmund became king of the English in 939. However, when Edmund was killed in a brawl, his younger brother, Eadred of Wessex took over as king. Then in 947 the Northumbrians rejected Eadred and made the Norwegian Eric Bloodaxe (Eirik Haraldsson) their king. Eadred responded by invading and ravaging Northumbria. When the Saxons headed back south, Eric Bloodaxe's army caught up with some them at Castleford and made 'great slaughter'. Eadred threatened to destroy Northumbria in revenge, so the Northumbrians turned their back on Eric and acknowledged Eadred as their king. The Northumbrians then had another change of heart and accepted Olaf Sihtricsson as their ruler, only to have Eric Bloodaxe remove him and become king of the Northumbrians again. Then, in 954, Eric Bloodaxe was expelled for the second and final time by Eadred. Bloodaxe was the last Norse king of Northumbria.

Second invasion: 980–1012

England
Under the reign of Wessex King Edgar the Peaceful, England came to be further politically unified, with Edgar coming to be recognised as the king of all England by both Anglo-Saxon and Viking populations living in the country. However, in the reigns of his son Edward the Martyr, who was murdered in 978, and then Æthelred the Unready, the political strength of the English monarchy waned, and, in 980, Viking raiders from Scandinavia resumed attacks against England. The English government decided that the only way of dealing with these attackers was to pay them protection money, and so, in 991, they gave them £10,000. This fee did not prove to be enough, and, over the next decade, the English kingdom was forced to pay the Viking attackers increasingly large sums of money. Many English began to demand that a more hostile approach be taken against the Vikings, and so, on St Brice's Day in 1002, King Æthelred proclaimed that all Danes living in England would be executed. It would come to be known as the St. Brice's Day massacre.

The news of the massacre reached King Sweyn Forkbeard in Denmark. It is believed that Sweyn's sister Gunhilde could have been among the victims, which prompted Sweyn to raid England the following year, when Exeter was burned down. Hampshire, Wiltshire, Wilton, and Salisbury also fell victim to the Viking revenge attack. Sweyn continued his raid in England and in 1004 his Viking army looted East Anglia, plundered Thetford and sacked Norwich, before he once again returned to Denmark.

Further raids took place in 1006–1007, and, in 1009–1012, Thorkell the Tall led a Viking invasion into England.

In 1013, Sweyn Forkbeard returned to invade England with a large army, and Æthelred fled to Normandy, leading Sweyn to take the English throne. Sweyn died within a year, however, and so Æthelred returned, but, in 1016, another Viking army invaded, this time under the control of the Danish King Cnut, Sweyn's son. After defeating Anglo-Saxon forces at the Battle of Assandun, Cnut became king of England, subsequently ruling over both the Danish and English kingdoms. Following Cnut's death in 1035, the two kingdoms were once more declared independent and remained so, apart from a short period from 1040 to 1042 when Cnut's son Harthacnut ascended the English throne.

Stamford Bridge: 1066

Harald Hardrada, King of Norway, led an invasion of England in 1066 with 300 longships and 10,000 soldiers, attempting to seize the English throne during the succession dispute following the death of Edward the Confessor. He met initial success, defeating the outnumbered forces mustered by the earldoms of Northumbria and Mercia at the Battle of Fulford. Whilst basking in his victory and occupying Northumbria in preparation for the advance south, Harald's army was surprised by a similarly sized force led by King Harold Godwinson, which had managed to force march all the way there from London in a week. The invasion was repulsed at the Battle of Stamford Bridge, and Hardrada was killed along with most of his men. Whilst the Viking attempt was unsuccessful, the near simultaneous Norman invasion was successful in the south at the Battle of Hastings. Hardrada's invasion and defeat has been described as the end of the Viking Age in Britain.

Written records
Archaeologists James Graham-Campbell and Colleen E. Batey noted that there was a lack of historical sources discussing the earliest Viking encounters with the British Isles, which would have most probably been amongst the northern island groups, those closest to Scandinavia.

The Irish Annals provide us with accounts of much Viking activity during the 9th and 10th centuries.

The England Runestones, concentrated in Sweden, give accounts of the voyages from the Viking perspective.

The Viking raids that affected Anglo-Saxon England were primarily documented in the Anglo-Saxon Chronicle, a collection of annals initially written in the late ninth century, most probably in the Kingdom of Wessex during the reign of Alfred the Great. The Chronicle is, however, a biased source, acting as a piece of "wartime propaganda" written on behalf of the Anglo-Saxon forces against their Viking opponents, and, in many cases, greatly exaggerates the size of the Viking fleets and armies, thereby making any Anglo-Saxon victories against them seem more heroic.

Archaeological evidence
The Viking settlers in the British Isles left remains of their material culture behind, which archaeologists have been able to excavate and interpret during the 20th and 21st centuries. Such Viking evidence in Britain consists primarily of Viking burials undertaken in Shetland, Orkney, the Western Isles, the Isle of Man, Ireland, and the north-west of England. Archaeologists James Graham-Campbell and Colleen E. Batey remarked that it was on the Isle of Man where Norse archaeology was "remarkably rich in quality and quantity".

However, as archaeologist Julian D. Richards commented, Scandinavians in Anglo-Saxon England "can be elusive to the archaeologist" because many of their houses and graves are indistinguishable from those of the other populations living in the country. For this reason, historian Peter Hunter Blair noted that, in Britain, the archaeological evidence for Viking invasion and settlement was "very slight compared with the corresponding evidence for the Anglo-Saxon invasions" of the fifth century.

See also
 Kingdom of the Isles
 Scandinavian Scotland
 Orkney
 Earldom of Orkney
 History of Shetland
 Orkneyinga saga
 Viking Age
 :Category:Scandinavian Scotland
 Norman conquest of England

References

Footnotes

Citations

Bibliography

External links
 BBC History - The Vikings

Scandinavian Scotland
 
History of the British Isles